Bernard McGurrin (born 12 July 1933) is an English former professional rugby league footballer who played in the 1950s and 1960s.

Background
Bernard McGurrin was born in Wigan, Lancashire, England.

Playing career

Challenge Cup Final appearances
Bernard McGurrin played  in Wigan's 13–9 victory over Workington Town in the 1958 Challenge Cup Final during the 1957–58 season at Wembley Stadium, London on Saturday 10 May 1958, in front of a crowd of 66,109.

County Cup Final appearances
Bernard McGurrin played  in Wigan's 8–13 defeat by Oldham in the 1957–58 Lancashire County Cup Final during the 1957–58 season at Station Road, Swinton on Saturday 19 October 1957, in front of a crowd of 42,497.

Notable tour matches
Bernard McGurrin played  in a combined Oldham & Rochdale Hornets team in the 10–8 victory over New Zealand in the 1961 New Zealand rugby league tour of Great Britain and France match at Watersheddings, Oldham on Monday 4 September 1961, in front of a crowd of 8,795.

Club career
Bernard McGurrin made his début for Wigan he played  in the 17–14 victory over Workington Town at Central Park, Wigan on Saturday 3 December 1955, he scored his first try for Wigan in the 21–8 victory over Widnes at Central Park, Wigan on Saturday 14 January 1956, he scored his last try for Wigan in the 22–5 victory over Wakefield Trinity at Central Park, Wigan on Saturday 3 January 1959, he played his last match for Wigan in the 22–5 victory over Wakefield Trinity at Central Park, Wigan on Saturday 3 January 1959.

Genealogical information
Bernard McGurrin's marriage to Mary E. (née Sinclair) was registered during first ¼ 1955 in Wigan district. They had children; the future rugby league footballer who played in the 1970s for Leigh (A-Team); Bernard McGurrin (birth registered during fourth ¼  in Ince district), and Angela McGurrin (birth registered during second ¼  in Wigan district).

References

External links

1933 births
Leigh Leopards players
Living people
English rugby league players
Rochdale Hornets captains
Rochdale Hornets players
Rugby league centres
Rugby league five-eighths
Rugby league locks
Rugby league players from Wigan
Wigan Warriors players